The Seydel Companies, Inc. is a producer of specialty chemicals used primarily in the textile and apparel, paper and packaging, personal care, agriculture, and metalworking industries based in Pendergrass, Georgia. Seydel-Woolley & Co., Chemol Company, Seydel International, and JRS Manufacturing are Seydel's four companies.

History 

The Seydel Companies, Inc. was founded by brothers Herman and Paul B. Seydel in 1907 in Atlanta, Georgia under the name Seydel Chemicals. The company relocated to New Jersey in 1910, then expanded into West Virginia in 1919. The Seydel-Thomas Company was formed in Atlanta by Paul B. Seydel in 1923, which soon became Seydel-Wooley & Company in 1924.  After World War II, Paul V. Seydel authored the book Textile Warp Sizing, a widely used industry textbook. In 1963, John R. Seydel expanded the company to include toll manufacturing, merged with the AZ Products, and launched Seydel International to export products globally. In 1966, the Seydel Companies acquired Chemol Company, Inc.

Awards 

The Seydel Companies, Inc. has repeatedly won the Environmental Protection Agency's Waste Wise Partner of the Year Award 

List of Awards:

 EPA's Waste Wise Small Business Partner of the Year: 1999, 2000, 2001, 2002, 2006
 Waste Wise EPA Climate Change Program Champion, 2002
 Waste Wise EPA Small Business Program Champion, 2002
 The Boy Scouts of America Environmental Award 1998, 1999, 2001, 2002, 2003
 The Atlanta Business Chronicle’s Fast Tech 50 Award 1990-2001
 The Jackson County Chamber of Commerce, Large Business of the Year, 2006

Community Involvement 

The Seydel Companies, Inc. is involved with the following community efforts:

 Jackson County Business Association
 Jackson County Chamber of Commerce
 Georgia Chamber of Commerce
 Jefferson IDA
 Athletic Team Sponsorships and Booster Clubs
 Partners in Education
 Georgia Special Olympics
 Upper Chattahoochee Riverkeepers

References

External links
 Official website

Companies based in Jackson County, Georgia
Manufacturing companies based in Georgia (U.S. state)
Chemical companies of the United States
Chemical companies established in 1907
1907 establishments in Georgia (U.S. state)